The  is a small table, desk or platform used during Shinto ceremonies to bear offerings. It may have four, eight or sixteen legs; the eight-legged variety, called , is the most common.

See also 
 Glossary of Shinto, for an explanation of terms concerning Shinto, Shinto art, and Shinto shrine architecture.
 Basic Terms of Shinto, Kokugakuin University, Institute for Japanese Culture and Classics, Tokyo 1985

References
 
 

Tables (furniture)
Shinto religious objects